Johann Anton Edler von Braunmühl (22 December 1853, Tiflis – 7 March 1908, München) was a German historian of mathematics and mathematician who worked on synthetic geometry and trigonometry. 

Braunmühl was born in Tiflis but came from a Bavarian family and his father had gone as an architect to build a palace. The death of his father in 1856 led to the mother and family moving to Munich where he went to school. His mother died in 1866 after which he was taken care of by an uncle. He passed school in 1873 and joined the University of Munich where he studied physics under G. Bauer, L. von Seidel, J. von Lamont, Philip Von Jolly, Friedrich Narr and history under M. Bernays and B. Riehl. He also attended classes in mathematics at the polytechnikum under A. Brill, F. Klein and J.N. Bischoff. He received a doctorate summa cum laude in 1878 and at the same time began to teach at the Realgymnasium. In 1879 he married Franziska Stölzl; they had two daughters. He became a professor in 1892. His teaching were on algebraic analysis, projective geometry, and trigonometry and his students included chemists and architects. In 1893-94 he also began to teach the history of mathematics. This would lead to his comprehensive survey of the history of trigonometry in two volumes, published in 1900/1903. He then took up writing a two-volume history of mathematics but he died before it could be published. His manuscript was worked on by Heinrich Wieleitner.

References

External links 
 A. von Braunmühl (1903) Vorlesungen über Geschichte der Trigonometrie via Internet Archive

1853 births
1908 deaths
Edlers of Germany
19th-century German mathematicians
20th-century German mathematicians
German historians of mathematics
Academic staff of the Technical University of Munich
19th-century German writers
19th-century German male writers
German male non-fiction writers